Mark Estrin might refer to:
Marc Estrin (b. 1939), American writer, activist, and cellist
Mark Estrin (1947–2005), American screenwriter and vintner, brother and screenwriting partner of Allen Estrin